Potential analysis describes the structural examination of specific characteristics and competencies. Potential analyses provide information about abilities of employees, future events, methods or organizations. Due to that the analysis of the branch of production, the financial sphere, the research & development and the human resources is differentiated.

A company might analyze its own potential (productivity, market position) by comparing it to those of the competitors (benchmarking). A market can be analyzed to estimate its potential for a certain product. Processes can be structurally analyzed due to their optimization.

Quality criteria of a potential analysis

The bases of a qualitative potential analysis are the following quality criteria that need to be fulfilled for any kind of potential analysis.
Validity: should show that the used potential analysis tool is suitable and whether the significance of the examination of future executives is established or not.
 Reliability: reliability in potential analysis means to make tests comparable. The potential analysis tools should have the same result after being carried out several times.
 Objectivity: The quality criteria objectivity should ensure that the results of potential analysis were not disturbed by personal influences.

Potential Analysis in the Talent Management

Importance of the potential analysis
The Potential Analysis in human resources is pioneering as a part of a goal- and future-oriented talent management. Talent Management characterizes the acquisition, development and long-term retention of qualified employees. Due to the future demographic change the "war for talents", which is searching and retaining future talents/executives will be intensified.
Furthermore, employers have to offer certain attractivity. Nowadays transparent career paths and conveying processes are more important than solely high wages. Talents or "high potentials" need to have a professional perspective, otherwise they will leave the company they are working for or even the country. Every year a high number of well-educated persons leave their home country. This knowledge-migration needs to be avoided and thus the potential analysis becomes even more important. Talents need to be acquired, their skills must be developed and in the end talents should be retained in companies.

Objectives of potential analysis
The objectives of potential analysis are mainly based on the punctual identification, development and retention of talents or future high potentials. Potential analysis' are used to identify talents, who cannot be identified by school or college grades but for example in terms of social competence, flexibility or emotional behavior.
Using potential analysis, companies intend to achieve the optimal fit of individual – job and organization. This means, an employee has to fit his job and purpose, and the company and its corporate culture. 
Concerning costs, miscasts should furthermore be avoided. For professionals, costs due to miscast amount to 50% of the annual salary plus wage labor costs whereas for executives costs are a total of 75%-100% of the annual salary plus wage labor costs.
In addition, the company's future competitiveness and efficiency should be improved as well as the attractivity as employer in the mentioned “war for talents”.

Employee selection criteria
Subsequent selection criteria of potential analysis are going to be explained. The selection criteria of employees are based on characteristics such as methodological expertise, social competence, professional competence as well as critical thinking and competence in modification. All these characteristics are regarded as a part of an employee's potential. Because these characteristics are difficult to measure, subordinate criteria are assigned.
Due to a multitude of criteria, the division into cognitive, motivational and social interaction criteria is used to make this multitude comprehensible. Cognitive criteria describe criteria that can be observed like organization, problem-solving and flexibility. Leadership motivation, stress-coping and self-confidence characterize motivational criteria whereas communication, teamwork and empathy belong to social-interactive criteria. 
The choice of the selection criteria is substantial to what extent potential analysis is accomplished carefully. The professional differentiation of criteria out of future strategic requirements should be done by Human resource management. Conclusively, the careful selection of criteria is founded on the knowledge about the target group. In cases of a university graduate other criteria should be examined in comparison to a professional who wants to become an executive.

Quality features of potential analysis
In the preceding part quality criteria of potential analysis were described. In the following features which have to be fulfilled to ensure a qualitative and professional implementation of potential analysis in Human Resources are pronounced. 
First of all Human Resource managers should combine various methods to identify more specific characteristics and skills of a candidate.
To achieve the already mentioned optimal fit of individual – job and organization, an orientation of the candidates target profile and the competencies are needed for a job. Therefore, it is significant that a precise definition of the examined competencies is given.
A qualitatively good potential analysis is based on a solid preparation, requiring a certain period of time. Potential analyses of single candidates require one day whereas the analysis of a group needs up to three days.
According to the mentioned time and preparation aspect, it becomes obvious that both the Human resources and the candidates need to be prepared and introduced to the topic of potential analysis. Furthermore, it is important that candidates have the possibility to get feedback and an explanation where their strengths and weaknesses are situated.

Risks
Companies, which ignore the demographic and social changes and do not recognize that their future economic competitiveness and efficiency is based on talented and highly qualified employees, are risk-prone.
Not identifying “High potentials” and developing their skills, leads to an insufficient and unsatisfying succession planning and in the end to failed employee retention. Employees, who are aware of their competencies and who do not have the possibility to develop those by taking the next step on career paths, will leave a company immediately.
In association with a failed retention and high fluctuation companies are facing enormous costs due to the already mentioned miscast of employees. Potential analysis and transparent career paths can avoid this problem.
Companies with a good reputation have fewer problems with obtaining young and skilled employees, while companies with a negative image are confronted with the problem of requiring but not getting talented, highly qualified employees. A problem that might cause risks, considering the future “war for talents”

Potential Analysis Tools
Potential Analysis in Human resources uses numerous tools to examine a person's potential. On this occasion it is important to know that potential analysis' are always target-group specific and business-specific. Banks use other tools and selection criteria than an advertising agency.

Tests
Tests are the simplest and most standardized procedures for potential evaluation. They are considered to be observer-neutral and objective. For this reason test is the most commonly used potential analysis tool. Tests can be distinguished into intelligence tests, performance tests and personality tests.
Intelligence tests measure intellectual abilities like mathematical analogies in which the quality and quickness of question-solving is crucial. Intelligence tests belong to the tests with a high validity.
Performance tests are used to determine special abilities such as the ability to concentrate and responsiveness. These types of tests are used for the potential evaluation for jobs with high, specific requirements..
Personality tests: Measuring emotional, motivational and interpersonal characteristics is the purpose of personality tests. The results of these tests are compared to those of a reference-population.

Interviews
In potential analysis interviews are largely distributed and are highly accepted by all persons who are involved. The validity of interviews varies substantially in dependence of the used method. Interviews can be divided into biographical and multimodal interviews.
Biographical interview: By using this kind of biographical interviews the self-interpretation of one owns biography is essential. The interviewed person should evaluate its own strengths and weaknesses. By that the behavioral pattern of the interviewed should be determined.
Multimodal Interview: This is a semi-structured type of interview which combines a series of standardized and unconcealed interview sections.

Assessment Center
Assessment-Center are highly structured procedures which are characterized by independent exercises. By using this tool, a realistic simulation of important professional tasks is given. Assessment-Center are usually group-processes with high validity and acceptance of the involved people.
Single-Assessment and Hearing: Single-Assessments are structured procedures which combine various instruments and last several hours. They are mainly used to select junior-specialist or experts. After passing the single-assessment the candidate speak to a committee of future superiors, colleagues and the board of directors.
Self-Assessment: By using the self-assessment type a candidate can try to examine her or his own knowledge, potential and tendencies. The self-assessment method is based on an IT-supported questionnaire and is mostly used in case of applications.

360° Feedback
The 360° Feedback is a feedback method in which colleagues, superiors, customers and suppliers and other employees participate. The comparison of the own valuation and the valuation of others is essential. Due to this procedure deviations between the own valuation and the valuation of the others can arise and been used for improvements. Therefore, 360° Feedback method is supposed to be repeated after a certain period of time.

Management Audit
A Management Audit is an evaluation process which estimates the leadership qualities/management skills of the existing manpower. External consultants examine employee's skills and potential with different tests. After that an interview is used to present the employees experience, competencies and leadership-qualities. The result of management audits is communicated by a recommendation.

References

Human resource management